Monteith and Rand were a comedy team who had their own Broadway show at the Booth Theater in 1979, produced by James Lipton, after a successful off-Broadway run. Suzanne Rand and John Monteith were graduates of Second City; Suzanne was in the famed company that included John Belushi and Brian Doyle Murray in Chicago, and John performed with John Candy, Dan Aykroyd and Gilda Radner in Toronto. Monteith and Rand lived in New York City where they taught and performed.

John Monteith died on 16 January 2018 in Jersey City, New Jersey.

References

American comedy duos